Tansey is a surname. Notable people with the surname include: 

 Charlotte Tansey (c. 1922–2010), Canadian academic
 Gerry Tansey, English football player
 Greg Tansey (born 1988), English football player
 Jim Tansey (born 1953), Australian football player
 Jimmy Tansey (1929–2012), English football player 
 John Tansey (1901–1971), American actor
 Jordan Tansey (born 1986), English rugby league player
 Luraine Tansey (1918–2014), American slide librarian
 Marie Tansey (born 1930), American politician
 Mark Tansey (born 1949), American painter
 Paul Tansey (1949-2008), Irish journalist 
 Sarah Tansey (born 1972), British actress
 Seamus Tansey (born 1943), Irish flute player 
 Tilli Tansey (born 1953), British historian of medical science

Given name
 Tansey Coetzee (born 1984), South African beauty pageant titleholder

Places 
 Tansey, Queensland, a town and locality in the Gympie Region, Queensland, Australia

See also
 Tansy, a plant
 Tansley, a village in Derbyshire